The Charlie Earp Bridge  is a road bridge over the Airport Drive in Brisbane, Queensland, Australia.

It provides access to the Airport Village and the shopping centre with its anchor tenant, DFO Brisbane.

References

External links
Map of Airport Village in Brisbane

Bridges in Brisbane
Road bridges in Queensland
Bridges completed in 2005
Concrete bridges in Australia